Crimes of the Heart is a 1986 American black comedy-drama film directed by Bruce Beresford from a screenplay written by Beth Henley adapted from her Pulitzer Prize-winning 1979 play of the same name. It stars Diane Keaton, Jessica Lange, Sissy Spacek, Sam Shepard, Tess Harper, and Hurd Hatfield. The film's narrative follows the Magrath sisters, Babe, Lenny and Meg, who reunite in their family home in Mississippi to regroup and settle their past. Each sister is forced to face the consequences of the "crimes of the heart" she has committed.

Crimes Of The Heart was theatrically released by  De Laurentiis Entertainment Group on December 12, 1986. It received positive reviews with critics praising its screenplay and performances (most notably Spacek's), but was a box office disappointment; grossing $22.9 million on a $20 million budget. The film received three nominations at the 59th Academy Awards; Best Actress (for Spacek), Best Supporting Actress (for Harper), and Best Adapted Screenplay. At the 44th Golden Globe Awards, it received a nomination for the Best Motion Picture – Musical or Comedy, with Spacek winning Best Actress.

Plot
The story focuses on the Magrath sisters—Lenny, Meg, and Babe—who reunite at the family home in Hazlehurst, Mississippi, after Babe shoots her abusive husband. The three were raised by Old Granddaddy after their mother hanged herself and the family cat and have been eccentric ever since. Lenny is a wallflower who bemoans her shriveled ovary. Egocentric Meg is a singer whose Hollywood career ended abruptly when she suffered a nervous breakdown. Unruly and impulsive Babe shocks her sisters with stories about her affair with a teenage African American boy. Past resentments bubble to the surface as the women are forced to deal with assorted relatives and previous relationships while coping with the latest incident that has disrupted their dysfunctional lives.

Cast

Release

Box office
The film opened on 246 screens in the US and earned $1,402,921 on its opening weekend. It eventually grossed $22,905,522 in the United States and Canada.

Critical reception

Crimes Of The Heart received positive reviews among critics, with Spacek's performance being widely highlighted and lauded. Roger Ebert of the Chicago Sun-Times called the film "that most delicate of undertakings: a comedy about serious matters. It exists somewhere between parody and melodrama, between the tragic and the goofy. There are moments when the movie doesn't seem to know where it's going, but for once that's a good thing because the uncertainty almost always ends with some kind of a delightful, weird surprise. The underlying tone ... is a deep, abiding comic affection, a love for these characters who survive in the middle of a thicket of Southern Gothic clichés and archetypes."

Rita Kempley of The Washington Post described it as "Hannah and Her Sisters with a southern accent, a lilting gingerbread gothic with Diane Keaton, Sissy Spacek and Jessica Lange ding-a-linging harmoniously as Dixieland belles" and added, "Playwright Beth Henley has no dire message for us, but her adaptation is nicely restructured, glib as all get-out and character-wise ... The powerhouse performances are directed by Bruce Beresford, who maintains balance among the actresses and keeps a lovely tone and smooth pace. As with his critically acclaimed Tender Mercies, the Australian director again looks at American types with a fresh eye."

Crimes of the Heart currently holds an 81% rating on Rotten Tomatoes based on 21 reviews.

Accolades

References

External links
 
 
 

1986 films
1986 comedy-drama films
American black comedy films
American comedy-drama films
American independent films
Films scored by Georges Delerue
Films about domestic violence
American films based on plays
Films directed by Bruce Beresford
Films featuring a Best Musical or Comedy Actress Golden Globe winning performance
Films set in Mississippi
Films shot in North Carolina
Films with screenplays by Beth Henley
Southern Gothic films
De Laurentiis Entertainment Group films
1980s black comedy films
1986 independent films
Films about sisters
1980s English-language films
1980s American films